Jacob Kornbluh is a reporter.

Career 
Kornbluh was born on May 29.

After moving to New York City, Kornbluh worked at a deli counter and hardware store, later owning a pizza shop while on the side he blogged and did videography. After seeing considerable response to his publications, Kornbluh decided to move fully into journalism.

Kornbluh has written for many local New York publications. In 2018 he was aggregating content for the Jewish Insider newsletter. He started at Yeshiva World News, later moved to the website JP Updates, and joined Jewish Insider in 2015. In January 2021, he left to join the Forward as Senior Political Correspondent. His beats were expected to include coverage of the early Biden administration, of local New York City elections, and of the results of Israel's upcoming national election.

Kornbluh uses Twitter in his reportage. He was included in the JTA's 2018 and 2019 lists of fifty Jewish twitter users. Armin Rosen included him in a 2016 Tablet article listing recommended Jewish Twitter users. At that time, Kornbluh had around 6600 followers on the site.

In 2013, Kornbluh posted a video of Democratic mayoral candidate Anthony D. Weiner engaging in a shouting match after being insulted by another customer at a Borough Park bakery. This video went viral and proved to be Kornbluh's first major exposure in broader media.

In 2013 the New York Times editorial board highlighted a video taken by Kornbluh of Rudy Giuliani.

Responses to coronavirus coverage 

Kornbluh produced considerable reportage on the reaction of the New York Orthodox Jewish community's reactions to the coronavirus pandemic. This included coverage of the refusal of some parts of this community to follow public health guidelines such as social distancing and masking. This led attacks against Kornbluh.

On October 8, 2020, Kornbluh attended and covered the second day of a Brooklyn, New York protest where members of the Orthodox Jewish community expressed opposition to new COVID-19 restrictions. Minor fires were set, masks were burned, and Kornbluh was attacked. Heshy Tischler, an anti-lockdown radio host, told protesters to yell at Kornbluh. Tischler was taken into custody for inciting a riot against Kornbluh. After Tischler's arrest that Sunday, a group of young men arrived at Kornbluh's home. They shouted, calling Kornbluh a snitch and an informer. They stood on Kornbluh's doorstep, a line of police officers keeping them away from the house.

On the next day, Monday, Jewish Democratic Council of America executive director Halie Soifer and Republican Jewish Coalition head Matt Brooks issued a joint statement condemning the attacks on Kornbluh. In 2021, Tischler pled guilty to inciting a riot for the event and sentenced to ten days of community service. The Brooklyn District Attorney requested an order of  protection for Kornbluh. In February 2023, Kornbluh appeared on Tischler radio show, where the two sparred over politics. Tischler apologized on air and said that to the New York Jewish Week that he was pleased to have Kornblub as a guest and that the two had "made peace" in the eyes of their Orthodox community.

Personal life 
Kornbluh was raised in London's Belzer Hasidic neighborhood of Stamford Hill. He attended a yeshiva in Israel at age 16 and moved to New York City four years later.

The fifth of seven children, Kornbluh largely spoke Yiddish with his father, who was a local community activist and a writer. His mother was a wig-maker and chef. It was with her that Kornbluh spoke English.

Kornbluh lives in Borough Park. As of 2020, he had been living there for 18 years. He is a Hasidic Jew.

References

Living people
Journalists from New York City
Year of birth missing (living people)